A list of films produced in the Soviet Union in 1932 (see 1932 in film).

1932

See also
1932 in the Soviet Union

External links
 Soviet films of 1932 at the Internet Movie Database

1932
Soviet
Films